George Edward Cates VC (9 May 1892 – 9 March 1917) was an  English recipient of the Victoria Cross (VC), the highest and most prestigious award for gallantry in the face of the enemy that can be awarded to British and Commonwealth forces.

Cates was born on 9 May 1892 to George and Alice Ann Cates, of Wimbledon, London. After attending Rutlish School in Merton, he worked as a clerk for an insurance company. In December 1914, after the outbreak of the First World War, he joined the 28th London Regiment (Artists’ Rifles), and went to France in August 1915. He was later commissioned second lieutenant.

He was a 24 years old second lieutenant in the 2nd Battalion, The Rifle Brigade (Prince Consort's Own), British Army, during the First World War, and was awarded the VC for his actions on 8 March 1917 at Bouchavesnes, France.

Citation

Cates died of his wounds the next day. Two of his brothers also died during the war.

His Victoria Cross is displayed at the Royal Green Jackets (Rifles) Museum, Winchester, England.

Cates is commemorated on both the Wimbledon and Richardson Evans Memorial Fields war memorials, and has a plaque at the former.

References

1892 births
1917 deaths
People from Wimbledon, London
Rifle Brigade officers
Artists' Rifles soldiers
British World War I recipients of the Victoria Cross
British military personnel killed in World War I
British Army personnel of World War I
British Army recipients of the Victoria Cross
People educated at Rutlish School